The ABA Rule of Law Initiative was established in 2007 by the American Bar Association to consolidate its five overseas rule of law programs, including the Central European and Eurasian Law Initiative (ABA CEELI), which was created in 1990 after the fall of the Berlin Wall. Today, the ABA Rule of Law Initiative (ABA ROLI) implements legal reform programs in 50 countries in Africa, Asia, Europe and Eurasia, Latin America and the Caribbean, and the Middle East and North Africa.

ABA ROLI has nearly 700 people, some working in the United States, but most serving abroad, including professional and local staff of the American Bar Association, plus a cadre of short- and long-term expatriate volunteers. Over the past 20 years, these volunteers have contributed more than $200 million in pro bono technical legal assistance. ABA ROLI's local partners include judges, lawyers, bar associations, law schools, court administrators, prosecutors, legislatures, ministries of justice, human rights organizations and other members of civil society.

Programs 
While ABA ROLI implements technical assistance programs in areas, including commercial and property law reform, programs are concentrated in seven areas.
 Access to justice and human rights. These programs increase access to legal services by establishing legal aid and law school clinics, developing public defender programs and supporting structural changes in the justice system that increase citizen access to the courts and other forms of dispute resolution. This work increases awareness of international human rights standards and humanitarian law, as well as trains legal professionals to seek redress for human rights violations in domestic, regional and international courts.
 Anti-corruption and public integrity. ABA ROLI programs focus on drafting and implementing public integrity standards and freedom of information laws, developing national action plans, conducting public education campaigns on the corrosive impact of corruption, and encouraging the public to combat corruption through mechanisms such as anonymous hotlines.
 Criminal law reform and anti-human trafficking. These programs train criminal justice professionals—including judges, prosecutors and police—to combat crimes such as human trafficking, money laundering and cybercrime, while helping to reform key criminal law legislation, including criminal procedure codes.
 Judicial reform. ABA ROLI promotes greater independence, accountability and transparency in judicial systems, assists in drafting and enacting codes of judicial ethics, promotes judicial education and training, and enhances court administration and efficiency.
 Legal education reform and civic education. This work promotes legal education reform by assisting law schools in introducing new courses and practical training methods that better meet the needs of tomorrow's legal professionals. A rule of law culture is promoted through civic education campaigns on citizens’ rights.
 Legal profession reform. Programs include assisting in the development and administration of bar examinations, developing codes of legal ethics, and strengthening bar associations to serve as advocates for, and protectors of, the rule of law. ABA ROLI also enhances continuing legal education programs to ensure adequate mastery of existing and newly enacted laws.
 Women's rights. ABA ROLI focuses on assisting both government and non-governmental entities in addressing women's rights issues such as domestic violence, sexual harassment in the workplace and widespread gender-based violence (including systematic rape in post-conflict situations).

Countries 
Since 1990, ABA ROLI has worked in more than 70 countries. Today, ABA ROLI operates a range of legal technical assistance programs in more than 40 countries. Some examples include ABA ROLI's program in the Democratic Republic of Congo, where mobile court and other programs help combat the rape epidemic. In the Philippines, ABA ROLI partners with the Supreme Court to offer trainings on the recently established small claims courts. In Armenia, they work with public defenders and the legal aid community to better represent those accused of crimes. ABA ROLI offers judicial exchange programs for judges and court professionals in Ecuador, which allow them to observe the accusatorial justice system in action. In Jordan, they work with law schools and professional associations to enhance the availability of continuing legal education for young lawyers.

Research and assessments
ABA ROLI's overseas work is supported by legal research and assessments. The program conducts assessments of draft legislation at the request of host country partners, conducts legal research, produces resource guides on rule of law issues, and develops and implements assessment tools. 

ABA ROLI has developed the following assessment tools: Judicial Reform Index; Legal Profession Reform Index; Prosecutorial Reform Index; Legal Education Reform Index; Human Trafficking Assessment Tool, based on the anti-human trafficking protocol to the United Nations (UN) Convention against Transnational Organized Crime; ICCPR Index, based on the UN International Covenant on Civil and Political Rights; and the CEDAW Assessment Tool, based on the UN Convention on the Elimination of All Forms of Discrimination Against Women.

ABA ROLI has conducted 50 assessments in 20 countries using these tools, all of which are publicly available and are regularly relied upon by local reformers, technical assistance providers, international donors and scholars.

Principles 
 Uses a consultative approach to the delivery of technical assistance that is responsive to the requests and priorities of our local partners.
 Employing a comparative approach in the provision of technical legal assistance, with the U.S. legal system providing just one of several models upon which host country reformers can draw.
 Providing technical assistance and advice that is neutral and apolitical.
 Building local capacity by strengthening institutions in both the governmental and non-governmental sectors and by furthering the professional development of ABA ROLI's host country staff, many of whom become the next generation of leaders in their countries.
 Providing thought leadership in the field of rule of law promotion that draws on overseas field experience and on the resources and convening power of the ABA and its 400,000 members in the United States and abroad.

Board and special advisors

Board 
 Hon. M. Margaret McKeown, Chair
 Hon. Rosemary Barkett 
 Homer E. Moyer, Jr.
 Paulette Brown
 Hon. Judith Chirlin
 Glenn Hendrix
 Laura Farber
 Robert Grey
 Roula Allouch
 Hon. James E. Baker
 Peter V. Baugher
 Don S. DeAmicis
 Hon. Carolyn S. Ostby
 Ed Potter
 Beverly J. Quail
 Steven M. Richman
 Hon. Lee H. Rosenthal
 Hon. Ramona G. See
 Wendy Shiba

Special advisors 
 Hon. Stephen G. Breyer
 Hon. Ruth Bader Ginsburg
 Hon. Anthony M. Kennedy
 Hon. Sandra Day O’Connor
 John A. Bohn 
 Hon. Robert Graham
 Robert J. Grey, Jr.

Rule of Law Award 
Each year, the ABA Rule of Law Award recognizes rule of law champion from around the world. Award recipients include: 
 Michelle Bachelet, Executive Director of UN Women and Former President of Chile
 Hon. Arthur Chaskalson, retired South African Supreme Court Chief Justice
 Zimbabwe Lawyers for Human Rights
 Those lawyers and judges in Pakistan who demonstrated courage in upholding the rule of law in their country
 Hon. Stephen Breyer, U.S. Supreme Court Justice
 Hon. Anthony Kennedy, U.S. Supreme Court Justice
 Hon. Hilario Davide, retired Philippine Supreme Court Chief Justice
 His Excellency Mikheil Saakashvili, President of Georgia
 His Excellency Vaclav Havel, President of The Czech Republic

References

External links 
 Official website

American Bar Association
Organizations established in 2007